Lee Jong-hwa (born 28 April 1974) is a South Korean diver. He competed in the men's 3 metre springboard event at the 1996 Summer Olympics.

References

1974 births
Living people
South Korean male divers
Olympic divers of South Korea
Divers at the 1996 Summer Olympics
Place of birth missing (living people)
20th-century South Korean people